Lisztomania or Liszt fever was the intense fan frenzy directed toward Hungarian composer Franz Liszt during his performances. This frenzy first occurred in Berlin in 1841 and the term was later coined by Heinrich Heine in a feuilleton he wrote on April 25, 1844, discussing the 1844 Parisian concert season. Lisztomania was characterized by intense levels of hysteria demonstrated by fans, akin to the treatment of celebrity musicians today – but in a time not known for such musical excitement.

Background
Franz Liszt began receiving piano lessons at the age of seven from his father Adam Liszt, a talented musician who played the piano, violin, cello, and guitar, and who knew Joseph Haydn, Johann Nepomuk Hummel, and Ludwig van Beethoven personally. By age eleven, Franz Liszt was already composing music and appearing in concerts. As he grew older, Liszt continued to study and develop his expertise at playing piano.

Liszt began an extensive tour of Europe in 1839, which he continued for the next eight years. This period was Liszt's most brilliant as a concert pianist and he received many honours and much adulation during his tours. Scholars have called these years a period of "transcendental execution" for Liszt. During this period, the first reports of intense responses from Liszt's fans appeared, which became referred to as Lisztomania.

Liszt arrived in Berlin around Christmas 1841, and word of his arrival soon spread. That night, a group of thirty students serenaded him with a performance of his song "Rheinweinlied". He later played his first recital in Berlin on December 27, 1841, at the Sing-Akademie zu Berlin to an enthusiastic crowd. This performance would later be marked as the beginning of Lisztomania, which would sweep generally across all of Europe after 1842.

Characteristics
Lisztomania was characterized by a hysterical reaction to Liszt and his concerts. Liszt's playing was reported to raise the mood of the audience to a level of mystical ecstasy. Admirers of Liszt would swarm over him, fighting over his handkerchiefs and gloves. Fans would wear his portrait on brooches and cameos. Women would try to get locks of his hair, and whenever he broke a piano string, admirers would try to obtain it in order to make a bracelet. Some female admirers would even carry glass phials into which they poured his coffee dregs. According to one report:

Creation and use of the term
The writer Heinrich Heine coined the term Lisztomania to describe the outpouring of emotion that accompanied Liszt and his performances. Heine wrote a series of musical feuilletons over several different music seasons discussing the music of the day. His review of the musical season of 1844, written in Paris on April 25, 1844, is the first place where he uses the term Lisztomania:

Musicologist Dana Gooley argues that Heine's use of the term "Lisztomania" was not used in the same way that "Beatlemania" was used to describe the intense emotion generated towards The Beatles in the 20th century. Instead, Lisztomania had much more of a medical emphasis because the term "mania" was a much stronger term in the 1840s, whereas in the 20th century "mania" could refer to something as mild as a new fashion craze. Lisztomania was considered by some a genuine contagious medical condition and critics recommended measures to immunize the public.

Some critics of the day thought that Lisztomania, or "Liszt fever" as it was sometimes called, was mainly a reflection of the attitudes of Berliners and Northern Germans and that Southern German cities would not have such episodes of Lisztomania because of the difference in constitutions of the populace. As one report stated in a Munich paper in 1843:

Causes
There was no known cause for Lisztomania, but there were attempts to explain the condition. Heine tried to explain the cause of Lisztomania in the same letter in which he first used the term. In that letter he wrote:

Dana Gooley argues that different people attributed the cause of Lisztomania in Berlin audiences in a different manner based on their political leanings at the time; furthermore, those who had a progressive view of affairs thought that the outpouring of emotions by Berlin audiences was largely a side effect of the repressive and censorious state and that the enthusiasm for Liszt was "compensatory, an illusory substitute for the lack of agency and public participation among Berliners". The opposing positive view of Lisztomania was that it was a response to Liszt's great benevolence and charity. This view was explained as follows:

One contributing factor to Lisztomania is also assumed to have been that Liszt, in his younger years, was known to be a handsome man.

See also 
 Stendhal syndrome
 Collective behavior
 Fad
 Beatlemania
 Lisztomania (film)
 "Lisztomania" (song)

References

Sources

External links
Lisztomania 2011 Festival, Burgenland, Austria
Lisztomania 2011, festival of seven concerts at New England Conservatory, Boston
"How Franz Liszt Became The World's First Rock Star", NPR story about Lisztomania

1841 establishments in Prussia
1840s neologisms
Franz Liszt
History of classical music
Mania
Somatic symptom disorders
Celebrity fandom
Music fandom
1840s in music
1840s in Europe